The cave monastery of Savina or Gornja Savina Isposnica is located in 15 km from the monastery of Studenica.

It is located in the Raška District.

See also
 List of Serbian monasteries
 Stanjevići Monastery
 Morača Monastery
 Piva Monastery
 Cetinje Monastery
 Podmaine Monastery
 Reževići Monastery
 Dajbabe Monastery
 Burčele Monastery
 Ostrog Monastery

References

Serbian Orthodox monasteries in Serbia
Caves of Serbia
Cave monasteries